Sucker Brook is a tributary of Lawrence Brook in central New Jersey in the United States.

Course
It travels in a pipe under Route 130, and then runs between a housing development. It drains into Lawrence Brook at  near Westons Mill Pond, a dammed section of Lawrence Brook.

Sister tributaries
Beaverdam Brook
Great Ditch
Ireland Brook
Oakeys Brook
Sawmill Brook
Terhune Run
Unnamed Brook in Rutgers Gardens, unofficially named Doc Brook
Unnamed Brook in Rutgers' Helyar Woods

History 

An 1876 map of North Brunswick shows that Sucker Brook at one time transversed the present day U.S. 1, Milltown Road, 4th, 3rd, 2nd, 1st Avenues, and Allgair Avenue, and ended near Nassau Street east of George's Road.

See also
List of rivers of New Jersey

References

External links
USGS Coordinates in Google Maps

Rivers of New Jersey
Tributaries of the Raritan River
Rivers of Middlesex County, New Jersey